Teuchert is a German language habitational surname. Notable people with the name include:
 Bert Teuchert (1966), German boxer
 Cedric Teuchert (1997), German professional footballer
 Hermann Teuchert (1880−1972), German historical linguist
 Wolfgang Teuchert (1924−2010), German art historian

References 

German-language surnames
German toponymic surnames